John Rune Alvbåge (born 10 August 1982) is a Swedish former professional footballer who played as a goalkeeper. Beginning his career with Torslanda IK in 1999, he went on to play professionally in Sweden, Denmark, Norway, the United States, and Cyprus before announcing his retirement in 2022. A full international between 2006 and 2009, he won four caps for the Sweden national football team and was a squad member at the 2006 FIFA World Cup.

Club career

Early career
After playing for local club Torslanda IK, he joined Västra Frölunda IF and debuted in the Swedish Allsvenskan, only 18 years old. He then moved to Örebro SK in 2003, before joining IFK Göteborg in 2005. He only stayed half a season at IFK Göteborg, where he was a backup for former Swedish international goalkeeper Bengt Andersson.

Viborg FF
He moved abroad later that same year, being bought by Danish club Viborg FF in July 2005. Bought as a replacement for Danish international goalkeeper Jesper Christiansen, Alvbåge quickly established himself in the Viborg team, and debuted for the Swedish national team in January 2006.

Return to Örebro SK
He returned to Örebro SK during the summer of 2008.

Return to IFK Göteborg
Before the start of the 2012 season, he returned to IFK Göteborg where he was the first-choice goalkeeper. He helped the club win two Svenska Cupen titles (2012–13 and 2014–15) during his time there.

Loan to Minnesota United
In January 2017 it was announced that Alvbåge had been loaned to Minnesota United FC of Major League Soccer until July 2017 with the option for an additional 18 months.

Retirement 
Alvbåge announced his retirement from professional football on 27 July 2022.

International career
Alvbåge represented Sweden at all youth levels, including U17, U19, and U21 level. He represented the Sweden U21 team at the 2004 UEFA European Under-21 Championship where Sweden finished fourth.

He made his full international debut for Sweden in a friendly game against Jordan on 23 January 2006. Later that year, he was selected for the 2006 FIFA World Cup squad as the third-choice goalkeeper behind Andreas Isaksson and Rami Shaaban. In total, he made four appearances for Sweden between 2006 and 2009.

Career statistics

Club

International

Honours

IFK Göteborg
Svenska Cupen: 2012–13, 2014–15
Individual
Allsvenskan goalkeeper of the year: 2015
Archangel of the Year: 2015

References

External links
 John Alvbåge at IFK Göteborg
 
 
 
 
 

1982 births
Living people
Swedish footballers
Association football goalkeepers
Sweden international footballers
Sweden youth international footballers
Sweden under-21 international footballers
2006 FIFA World Cup players
Allsvenskan players
Superettan players
Division 2 (Swedish football) players
Danish Superliga players
Cypriot First Division players
Major League Soccer players
IFK Göteborg players
Viborg FF players
Örebro SK players
Torslanda IK players
AC Omonia players
IK Sirius Fotboll players
Minnesota United FC players
Swedish expatriate footballers
Swedish expatriate sportspeople in Cyprus
Expatriate footballers in Cyprus
Swedish expatriate sportspeople in Denmark
Expatriate men's footballers in Denmark
Swedish expatriate sportspeople in the United States
Expatriate soccer players in the United States
Footballers from Gothenburg